Mount Lugering is a mountain nearly  high on the west side of the Lanterman Range, in the Bowers Mountains of Antarctica. It marks the north side of the terminus of Hunter Glacier where it joins Rennick Glacier. The mountain was mapped by the United States Geological Survey from ground surveys and U.S. Navy air photos, 1960–62, and was named by the Advisory Committee on Antarctic Names for utilitiesman Donald R. Lugering, U.S. Navy, of the South Pole Station winter party, 1965.

References

Mountains of Victoria Land
Pennell Coast